The Catholic Church opposes same-sex sexual activity and same-sex marriage. While the Church says it opposes "unjust" discrimination against homosexual persons, it supports what it considers "just" discrimination in the employment of teachers or athletic coaches, in adoption, in the military and in housing. The Catechism of the Catholic Church promulgated by Pope John Paul II considers sexual activity between members of the same sex to be a mortal sin against chastity. It sees homosexual orientation as objectively disordered. This teaching has developed through a number of ecumenical councils and the influence of theologians, including the Church Fathers.

The Congegration for the Doctrine of the Faith, in a document approved by Pope Francis, said that the church can not bless same-sex relationships because "God cannot bless sin", while also stating that the non-sexual aspect of the personal relationships between such people may have "positive elements".

The church provides pastoral care for LGBT Catholics through a variety of official and unofficial channels that vary from diocese to diocese, and senior clergy and popes have recently begun to call for the church to do more. In many parts of the world, the Church is active politically on issues of LGBT rights. The relationship between the Catholic Church and the LGBT community has been a difficult one, especially during the height of the AIDS crisis.

There have been notable Catholics who were gay or bisexual, including priests and bishops. Catholic dissenters from the official teaching say that love between people of the same sex is as spiritually valuable as love between people of the opposite sex and that LGBT Catholics are as much members of the body of Christ as heterosexuals are. Catholic organizations that support the official teaching may campaign against gay rights, or argue that gay people should be celibate.

Pope Francis was the first Pope to seemingly support same-sex civil unions; after a backlash from some within the church, he later clarified that he meant laws to protect certain rights, such as hospital visitation and inheritance. In February 2023, Pope Francis said, that criminalization of same-sexual acts in several countries in Africa/in Asia are wrong, a sin and an injustice, even though traditionally the Catholic hierarchy supported anti-sodomy laws.

Church teaching

According to the Compendium of the Catechism of the Catholic Church, "homosexual acts" are "grave sins against chastity" and "expressions of the vice of lust." Homosexual acts are included among the grave sins against chastity in the Catechism of the Catholic Church.

According to the Catechism, "homosexual acts" are "acts of grave depravity" that are "intrinsically disordered." It continues, "They are contrary to the natural law. They close the sexual act to the gift of life. They do not proceed from a genuine affective and sexual complementarity. Under no circumstances can they be approved." Regarding homosexuality as an orientation, the Catechism describes it as "objectively disordered."

The Catholic Church teaches that, as a person does not choose to be either homosexual or heterosexual, being gay is not inherently sinful. According to the Catholic theology of sexuality, all sexual acts must be open to procreation by nature and express the symbolism of male-female complementarity. Sexual acts between two members of the same sex cannot meet these standards. Homosexuality thus constitutes a tendency towards this sin. The church teaches that gay people are called to practice chastity.

The church also teaches that gay people "must be accepted with respect, compassion, and sensitivity", and that "every sign of unjust discrimination in their regard should be avoided." whilst holding that discrimination in marriage, employment, housing, and adoption in some circumstances can be just and "obligatory."

The church points to several passages in the Bible as the basis for its teachings, including Genesis 19:1-11, Leviticus 18:22 and 20:13, I Corinthians 6:9, Romans 1:18-32, and I Timothy 1:10. In December 2019, the Pontifical Biblical Commission published a book that included an exegesis on these and other passages.

Research conducted in the fields of social sciences and study of religion indicates that the Catholic Church's teachings on sexuality are "a major source of conflict and distress" to LGBT Catholics.

Same-sex marriage 
The church opposes same-sex marriage and is active in political campaigns against it. It also opposes same-sex civil unions and does not bless them, although some priests and bishops have offered blessings for same-sex couples or spoken in favor of priests being able to bless them.

In September 2021, Pope Francis expressed support for same-sex civil unions, saying that "same-sex civil unions are good and helpful to many".

History 

The Christian tradition has generally prohibited all sexual activities outside of sexual intercourse. This includes activities engaged in by couples or individuals of either the same or different sexes. The Catholic Church's position specifically on homosexuality developed from the teachings of the Church Fathers, which was in stark contrast to Greek and Roman attitudes towards same-sex relations, including pederasty.

Canon law regarding same-sex sexual activity has been shaped through the decrees issued by a series of ecclesiastical councils. Initially, canons against sodomy were aimed at ensuring clerical or monastic discipline, and were only widened in the medieval period to include laymen. In the Summa Theologica, Saint Thomas Aquinas maintained that homosexual practice was contrary to natural law, arguing that the primary natural end of the sexual act was procreation, and since said procreation is carried out from a process of sexual fertilization between a man and a woman, homosexuality is contrary to the very end of said act. He also stated that "the unnatural vice" is the greatest of the sins of lust. Throughout the Middle Ages, the church repeatedly condemned homosexuality, and often collaborated with civic authorities to punish gay people. Punishment of sexual "vice" as well as religious heresy was seen as strengthening the church's moral authority.

The modern church
In the late 20th century, the Church has responded to gay rights movements by reiterating its condemnation of homosexuality while acknowledging the existence of gay people. In January 1976, the Congregation of the Doctrine of the Faith under Pope Paul VI published Persona Humana, which codified the teaching against all extra-marital sex, including gay sex. The document stated that acceptance of homosexual activity runs counter to the church's teaching and morality. It drew a distinction between people who were homosexual because of "a false education," "a bad example" or other causes it described as "not incurable," and a "pathological" condition which was "incurable." However, it criticized those who argued that innate homosexuality justified same-sex sexual activity within loving relationships, and stated that the Bible condemned homosexual activity as depraved, "intrinsically disordered," never to be approved, and a consequence of rejecting God.

Earlier, the controversially liberal 1966 Dutch Catechism, which was the first post-Vatican II Catholic catechism and which had been commissioned by the Dutch bishops, had stated that "The very sharp strictures of Scripture on homosexual practices (Gen. 1; Rom. 1) must be read in their context" as condemning a trend for homosexuality among non-gay people, implying that people who were gay were not condemned for homosexual activity.

In October 1986, the Congregation for the Doctrine of the Faith released a letter addressed to all the bishops of the Catholic Church entitled On the Pastoral Care of Homosexual Persons. This was signed by Cardinal Joseph Ratzinger as prefect. The letter gave instructions on how the clergy should deal with, and respond to, lesbian, gay, and bisexual people. Designed to remove any ambiguity about permissible tolerance of homosexual orientation resulting from the earlier Persona Humana—and prompted by the growing influence of gay-accepting groups and clergy—the letter was particularly aimed at the church in the United States. It affirmed the position that while homosexual orientation is not in itself a sin, it is nevertheless a tendency towards the "moral evil" of homosexual activity, and therefore must be considered "an objective disorder", which moreover is "essentially self-indulgent" since homosexual sexual acts are not procreative and therefore not genuinely loving or selfless.

The letter also said that accepting homosexual acts as morally equivalent to married heterosexual acts was harmful to the family and society and warned bishops to be on guard against, and not to support, Catholic organizations not upholding the Church's doctrine on homosexuality—groups which the letter said were not really Catholic. This alluded to LGBT and LGBT-accepting Catholic groups such as DignityUSA and New Ways Ministry, and ultimately resulted in the exclusion of Dignity from Church property. The letter condemned physical and verbal violence against gay people but reiterated that this did not change its opposition to homosexuality or gay rights. Its claims that accepting and legalizing homosexual behaviour leads to violence ("neither the Church nor society at large should be surprised" when anti-gay hate crimes increase in the wake of gay civil rights legislation) were seen as controversially blaming gay people for homophobic violence and encouraging homophobic violence. Referring to the AIDS epidemic, the letter, McNeill writes, blamed AIDS on gay rights activists and gay-accepting mental health professionals: "Even when the practice of homosexuality may seriously threaten the lives and well-being of a large number of people, its advocates remain undeterred and refuse to consider the magnitude of the risks involved".

In a statement released in July 1992, "Some Considerations Concerning the Catholic Response to Legislative Proposals on the Non-Discrimination of Homosexual Persons," the Congregation for the Doctrine of the Faith reiterated its position from "On the Pastoral Care of Homosexual Persons," and further stated that discrimination against gay people in certain areas, such as selecting adoptive or foster parents or in hiring teachers, coaches, or military service members, is not unjust, and thus can be permitted in some circumstances.

Pastoral care for gay Catholics

Beginning in the 1970s, the United States Conference of Catholic Bishops taught that gays "should have an active role in the Christian community" and have called on "all Christians and citizens of good will to confront their own fears about homosexuality and to curb the humor and discrimination that offend homosexual persons. We understand that having a homosexual orientation brings with it enough anxiety, pain and issues related to self-acceptance without society bringing additional prejudicial treatment." In 1997, they published a letter entitled Always Our Children, as a pastoral message to parents of gay and bisexual children with guidelines for pastoral ministers. Reiterating the church's opposition to homosexuality, it told parents not to break off contact with a gay or bisexual son or daughter; they should instead look for appropriate counseling both for the child and for themselves. Gay Catholics, the bishops said, should be allowed to participate actively in the Christian community and, if living chastely, hold leadership positions. It also noted "an importance and urgency" to minister to those with AIDS, especially considering the impact it had on the gay community.

Bishops around the world have held diocesan events with the goal of reaching out to gay Catholics and ministering to them, and more have spoken publicly about the need to love and welcome them into the church. Pope John Paul II asked "the bishops to support, with the means at their disposal, the development of appropriate forms of pastoral care for homosexual persons.” Several assemblies of the Synod of Bishops have struck similar themes, while maintaining that same-sex sexual activity is sinful and that same-sex marriage cannot be permitted. In 2018, in a move regarded as a sign of respect to the community, the Vatican used the acronym LGBT for the first time in an official document. Pope Francis has also spoken out about the need for pastoral care for gay Catholics, adding that God made LGBT people that way.

The 2014 Synod on the Family and Synod on the Family in 2015 concerned themselves in part with "accepting and valuing their [gay Catholics'] sexual orientation" and place in Catholic communities, "without compromising Catholic doctrine on the family and matrimony." The reports of the synods were noted for their unusually mild language towards gay people, such as the lack of use of phrases such as "intrinsically disordered." They also reiterated the church's opposition to same-sex marriage and suggested outreach towards gay people.

Beginning in the 1960s, a number of organizations have formed to minister to LGBT people. Organizations such as DignityUSA and New Ways Ministry, which advocate for the rights of LGBT Catholics and dissent from Church teaching, and Courage International, which encourages Catholics with same-sex attraction to live chastely and accept Church teaching, were established in the United States in response to the push within the United States for greater recognition within the church for gay men and lesbian women. Courage also has a ministry geared towards the relatives and friends of gay people called Encourage. Courage is a recognized apostolate of the Church, while DignityUSA and New Ways Ministry have both been censured by the hierarchy of the American Catholic Church.

Dissent from church teaching

There have been practical and ministerial disagreements within the clergy, hierarchy, and laity of the Catholic Church concerning the church's position on homosexuality. Some Catholics and Catholic groups have sought to adopt an approach they consider to be more inclusive. Dissenters argue that the prohibition on extramarital sex emphasizes the physical dimension of the act at the expense of higher moral, personal and spiritual goals and that the practice of total, lifelong sexual denial risks personal isolation. Other arguments include that the teaching violates "the truth of God’s unconditional love for all people", and drives "young people away from the Church". Opponents argue that it is preferable to believe that this element of church teaching is mistaken. The opinion of lay Catholics tends to be more supportive of gay marriage than the hierarchy.

Upwards of 70 people have been fired from jobs at Catholic schools or universities because of their marriages to partners of the same sex or, in one case, support for LGBT rights campaigns. When one Jesuit high school refused to fire a teacher after he publicly entered into a gay marriage, the local bishop designated the school as no longer Catholic; the school has appealed his decision.
   
In response to church policy in the area of safe-sex education, AIDS, and gay rights, some gay rights activists have protested both inside and outside of Catholic churches, sometimes disrupting Masses. This includes at the National Shrine in Washington, at an ordination of priests at the Cathedral of the Holy Cross in Boston, and during Mass at St. Patrick's Cathedral in New York where they desecrated the Eucharist. Others have splattered paint on churches and drenched an archbishop with water. In 1998, Alfredo Ormando died after setting himself on fire outside Saint Peter's Basilica to protest the church's position on homosexuality.

On 9 September 2022, over 80% of German bishops at the Synodal Path supported a document calling for a "re-evaluation of homosexuality" and for making changes to the Catechism.
On March 11, 2023, the Synodal Path with support of over 80 percentage of German Roman Catholic bishops allowed blessing ceremonies for same-sex couples in all 27 German Roman Catholic diocese.

Catholic organizations
The Knights of Columbus, a Catholic fraternal organisation, has contributed over $14 million, one of the largest amounts in the United States, to political campaigns against same-sex marriage. The Catholic Medical Association of North America has stated that science "counters the myth that same-sex attraction is genetically predetermined and unchangeable, and offers hope for prevention and treatment." The Church, however, teaches that sexual orientation is not a choice. Bill Donohue, president of the Catholic League, has been criticized for describing the church child sex abuse crisis as a "homosexual" problem rather than a "pedophilia" problem. Donohue based his claim on the fact that most of the incidents involved sexual contact between men and boys rather than between men and girls.

Homosexuality in relation to clergy

Homosexual clergy, and homosexual activity by clergy, are not exclusively modern phenomena, but rather date back centuries. Donald Cozzens estimated the percentage of gay priests in 2000 to be 23–58%, suggesting more homosexual men (active and non-active) within the Catholic priesthood than within society at large.

Instructions from Vatican bodies on admitting gay men to the priesthood have varied over time. In the 1960s chaste gay men were allowed but in 2005 a new directive banned gay men "while profoundly respecting the persons in question."

Although homosexuality was at variance with Catholic teaching during the Middle Ages, official penalties for homosexual behavior within the clergy, both by the church and temporal authorities, were rarely codified or enforced.  Historian John Boswell noted that several bishops in the Middle Ages were thought by their contemporaries to have had gay relationships, and noted a potentially romantic or sexual tone to the correspondence of others with "passionate" male friends. Some other historians disagree, and say that this correspondence represents friendship. Although homosexual acts have been consistently condemned by the Catholic Church, some senior members of the clergy have been found or alleged to have had homosexual relationships, including Rembert Weakland, Juan Carlos Maccarone, Francisco Domingo Barbosa Da Silveira, and Keith O'Brien. Some Popes are documented to have been homosexual or to have had male sexual partners, including Pope Benedict IX, Pope Paul II, Pope Sixtus IV, Pope Leo X, Pope Julius II and Pope Julius III.

Political activity

The church has historically been politically active in local, national, and international fora on issues of LGBT rights, typically to oppose them in keeping with Catholic moral theology and Catholic Social Teaching.

In various countries, members of the Catholic Church have intervened on occasions both to support efforts to decriminalize homosexuality, and also to ensure it remains an offence under criminal law. The Catholic Church has been described as sending "mixed signals" regarding discrimination based on sexual orientation: a 1992 teaching said that because sexuality "evokes moral concern," sexual orientation is different from qualities such as race, ethnicity, sex, or age, which do not. It added that efforts to "protect the common good" by limiting rights were permissible and sometimes obligatory, and did not constitute discrimination. The church therefore opposes the extension of at least some aspects of civil rights legislation, such as nondiscrimination in public housing, educational or athletic employment, adoption, or military recruitment, to gay men and lesbians. The United States Conference of Catholic Bishops published a statement that was characterized by two theologians as claiming that "nondiscrimination legislation protecting LGBT people promotes immoral sexual behavior, endangers our children, and threatens religious liberty." It also campaigns against same-sex marriage.

Notable lesbian, gay, and bisexual Catholics

There have been notable gay Catholics throughout history. Writers such as Oscar Wilde, Lord Alfred Douglas, Marc-André Raffalovich, and Frederick Rolfe, and artists such as Robert Mapplethorpe, were influenced by both their Catholicism and their homosexuality. Gay Catholic academics such as John J. McNeill who was further on expelled from the Society of Jesus in 1987 at the request of the Vatican and John Boswell have produced work on the history and theological issues at the intersection of Christianity and homosexuality. Some notable LGBT Catholics are or were priests or nuns, such as McNeill, Virginia Apuzzo, and Jean O'Leary, who was a Roman Catholic religious sister before becoming a lesbian and gay rights activist.

See also

 List of Christian denominational positions on homosexuality
 Ministry to Persons with a Homosexual Inclination
 Ordination of LGBT Christian clergy

Notes

References

Works cited

Further reading
 
 
 
 
 
 
 
 Catholic Church 'cannot bless same-sex unions'. BBC News. Archived from the Wayback Machine on 19 June 2022. Pope Francis: CDF statements "not intended to be a form of unjust discrimination, but rather a reminder of the truth of the liturgical rite".

LGBT topics and Catholicism
Sexuality in Catholicism
Catholic theology of the body
Catholicism-related controversies